Kra or KRA can refer to:

 Kenya Revenue Authority
 Key result area, a management term
 Kra (band)
 Kra (letter)
 Kra Isthmus
 Kra Peninsula
 Kra River, Malay Peninsula
 Kra languages
 Kra (mythology)
 Krita native file extension
 Kerang Airport, IATA airport code "KRA"